In linguistics, causative alternation is a phenomenon in which certain verbs that express a change of state (or a change of degree) can be used transitively or intransitively.  A causatively alternating verb, called a labile or ergative verb, such as "open", has both a transitive meaning ("I opened the door") and an intransitive meaning ("The door opened"). When causatively alternating verbs are used transitively they are called causatives since, in the transitive use of the verb, the subject is causing the action denoted by the intransitive version. When causatively alternating verbs are used intransitively, they are referred to as anticausatives or inchoatives because the intransitive variant describes a situation in which the theme participant (in this case "the door") undergoes a change of state, becoming, for example, "opened".

Basic example

Example of the causative alternation with the English verb 'break':

(1) English
(1a) Transitive Use (Causative):                          John broke the vase.
(1b) Intransitive Use (Anticausative):			The vase broke

The general structure of the causative and anticausative variants of the causative alternation in English:

(2) The Causative Alternation:
(2a) Causative: agent   Verb-transitive   theme
(2b) Anticausative: theme   Verb-intransitive

The causative alternation is a transitivity alternation. The verb “break” demonstrates causative alternation because it can alternate between transitive (in the causative) and intransitive use (in the anticausative) and the transitive alternate “John broke the vase’' indicates the cause of the intransitive alternate “the vase broke.” In other words, the transitive use denotes that it was John that caused the vase to break. The causative alternative has an external argument (“John”), which bears the theta role agent which is not present in the intransitive alternative. The object of the causative alternative (“the vase”) bears the same thematic role of theme as the subject of the anticausative alternative (also “the vase”).

Principal characteristics
Cross-linguistically, the verbs that participate in the causative alternation are anticausatives which denote movement or a change of state or degree.

Anticausatives

Under one possible and fairly common analysis (called the Unaccusative Hypothesis), unaccusatives and unergatives form the two subclasses of intransitive verbs. Unaccusative verbs cannot assign case to their deep-structure object which bears the theme/patient thematic role; because of this, the object moves to the subject position in the surface form in order to obtain case in accordance with Burzio's generalization. The movement of "the book" from object position to subject position is traced in example (3a). Therefore, unaccusative verbs take a semantic theme or patient subject. On the other hand, unergative verbs take a semantic agent or initiator subject.

(3)
(3a) The booki fell ti   (unaccusative)
(3b) The child laughed (unergative)

Most unaccusative verbs participate in the causative alternation. The unaccusatives that do causatively alternate are anticausative verbs (like “break”) which make up a subclass of unaccusative verbs called alternating unaccusatives. The other subclass of unaccusative verbs, pure unaccusatives, consists of all other unaccusatives (like “fall”) that do not take part in causative alternation.

Though some unaccusative verbs can undergo causative alternation (anticausatives), it is never the case that an unergative (like “laugh”) can.

(4) Non-Alternation of Unergatives
(4a) The crowd laughed.
(4b)*The comedian laughed the crowd. (Intended meaning: The comedian made the crowd laugh.)

Change of state verbs
In various languages, it is seen that the verbs participating in the causative alternation are verbs that denote movement or a change of state or degree. However, not all change of state verbs are anticausatives and therefore, not all change of state verbs participate in the causative alternation. For instance, a change of state verb like 'bloom' does not show causative alternation as it is a pure unaccusative. It is possible to say that "The cactus bloomed," but it is ungrammatical to say that "The warm weather bloomed the cactus."

(5) Examples of causatively alternating change of state verbs
(5a) Roll Verbs: "roll", "bounce", "swing"
(5b) Break Verbs: "break", "chip", "crack"
(5c) Bend Verbs: "bend", "crease", "crinkle"
(5d) Amuse-Type Psych Verbs: "cheer", "delight", "thrill"
(5e) Zero-Related to Adjective Verbs: "blunt", "clear", "clean"
(5f) Change of Color Verbs: "blacken", "redden", "grey"
(5g) -en Verbs: "awaken", "brighten", "broaden"
(5h) -ify Verbs: "solidify", "stratify", "emulsify"
(5i) -ize Verbs: "democratize", "decentralize", "crystallize"
(5j) -ate Verbs: "accelerate", "ameliorate", "operate"

(6) Examples of non-causatively alternating change of state verbs
(6a) Change of Possession Verbs: "give", "donate", "owe"
(6b) Cutting Verbs: "cut", "carve", "slice"
(6c) Contact by Impact Verbs: "hit", "swat", "bludgeon"
(6d) Touch Verbs: "caress", "graze", "touch"
(6e) Destroy Verbs: "annihilate", "decimate", "destroy"
(6f) Killing Verbs: "kill", "shoot", "eliminate"
(6g) Verbs of Appearance, Disappearance, and Occurrence: "appear", "disappear", "occur"

Theoretical approaches

The general consensus in the field is that there is a derivational relationship between verbs undergoing the causative alternation that share the same lexical entry. From this it follows that there is uncertainty surrounding which form, the intransitive or the transitive, is the base from which the other is derived. Another matter of debate is whether the derivation takes place at the syntactic or lexical level.

With reference to these assumptions, syntactic and lexicalist accounts have been proposed. These approaches account for intransitive, transitive and common base approaches.

The intransitive base approaches, also known as causativization, state that the transitive variant is derived from the intransitive variant (the causative is derived from the anticausative) by adding one argument, that is an agent. The transitive base approaches, also known as decausativization, propose that the intransitive form is derived from the transitive by deleting one argument that is the agent. Common base approaches suggest that both the transitive and the intransitive forms are formulated from a common base.

Lexicalist

According to the intransitive base/causativization approach, the intransitive form is the base and a causative predicate is added to the Lexical Conceptual Structure (LCS) in order to make the verb transitive. In the following example (7), the basic LCS,  “The stick broke.” is embedded under a cause predicate, in this case “Katherine,” to form the derived LCS “Katherine broke the stick.”

(7) Causativization Rule
[(x) CHANGE] ⇒ [(y) CAUSE [(x) CHANGE]]

(7a) Example of causativization
The stick broke ⇒ Katherine broke the stick
(the stick) CHANGE ⇒ [(Katherine) CAUSE [(the stick) CHANGE]]

In (7a), “x” is the variable (“stick”), and the CHANGE operator refers to the change-of-state (“break”). In the anticausative (“the stick broke”) “the stick” undergoes the change “break”, namely, the stick breaks. Moreover, the “y” variable refers to “Katherine” and the CAUSE operator refers to the cause of the change (“break”). In the causative, (“Katherine broke the stick”), it is “Katherine” who causes the action “break”, and is therefore the cause operator.

The transitive/decausativation approach, assumes a lexical operation which performs precisely the opposite of the causativization approach discussed above.

In this approach, according to the following rule, the intransitive/anticausative form is derived from the transitive/causative form by deleting the cause predicate from the LCS. In example (8) below, the LCS is “Katherine broke the stick” and the cause predicate “Katherine” is deleted.

(8) Decausativization Rule
[(y) CAUSE [(x) CHANGE]] ⇒ [(x) CHANGE]

(8a) Example of decausativization 
Katherine broke the stick.
 ⇒ The stick broke.
[(Katherine) CAUSE [(the stick) CHANGE]] ⇒ [(the stick) CHANGE]

Syntactic

Under a syntactic intransitive base approach, the transitive form is derived from the intransitive form by insertion of a verbal layer projected by a head expressing causation and introducing the external agent argument. This idea assumes that a verbal phrase is able to be separated into different layers of verbal projections whereby each of the layers provide a specifier where an argument can be attached. In addition, the layers are joined together by head movement of the lowest verb head to positions higher in the syntactic structure. Change-of-state verbs are broken-down into the verbal layers of initiation phrase (initP), process phrase (procP) and result phrase (resP), which approximately correspond to the predicate cause, become, and state respectively.

Example (9a), the anticausative variant, is basic according to the intransitive base approach. The theme ("the stick") is initially merged into the specifier of resP and that it then moves to the specifier of procP. The theme, (“stick”)  is therefore given a complex theta-role of both the result and the undergoer of the event. In the syntax, the causative form is derived through the addition of an init-head, which introduces the external initiator argument (“Katherine”) in example (9b).

Connecting the lexical and syntactic analyses

The syntactic and lexical analyses correspond in the following ways:

In the lexical accounts, the causative alternation takes place at the level of the lexical conceptual structure (LCS), while in the syntactic accounts, the alternation happens at the level of the syntax, as a result of the interaction between the syntactic structure and the basic verbal element.

In the lexical accounts [x CHANGE] corresponds with the layered process phrase (procP) and the result phrase (resP)  in the syntactic account. The [y CAUSE [x CHANGE]] in the lexical accounts corresponds with the process phrase (procP), the result P (resP) along with initiator phrase (initP), which is the additional verbal layer in the syntactic account.  The presence of this additional verbal layer (initP) is what distinguishes the causative/transitive variant from the anticausative/instransitive variant in the syntactic account. In contrast, in the lexical accounts, the causative is determined by the presence of a causative predicate ([y CAUSE]).

Child language acquisition
Children typically begin to generate causatively alternating verbs around the age of 1;11 (years;months). Around this time the causative alternations closely resemble an adult-like form; however, around the age of 2;6 to 12;0 children begin making common errors of overregularization, in which they erroneously overuse the causative. Children often acquire the syntactic pattern that goes along with verbal alternations; however, that does not mean that they acquire the lexical semantic restrictions that accompany these alternations. Three common overregulizations include:
(29a) Fixed intransitive verbs as transitive verbs:
"Look at me swim her" [make her swim]
In (29a), children are incorrectly using a causative/transitive structure with a fixed intransitive verb (“swim”).
(29b) Fixed transitive verbs produced in intransitive contexts
"The snake cutted in half. [It cut in half]
In (29b) children are mistakenly employing a causative/transitive verb (“cut”) in an intransitive environment, where “cut” has the meaning of ‘separate in half.’
(29c) Suppletive verb substitutions which have different lexical items to show cause:
"Stay it there!" [keep it there] 
In (29c), children are erroneously using fixed intransitive verbs (such as “stay”) in environments where fixed transitive verbs (such as “keep”) would be used.
In language acquisition, once children establish that a particular transitivity alternation is productive, they often extend the alternation to new verbs, despite the argument structure of the individual verb. It has been suggested that causative alternation errors come from three sources:
(30a) Lexical rules being applied too broadly, thus not recognizing the narrow semantic restrictions of verbs
(30b) Reflections of retrieval errors, where the wrong verb stem is retrieved under discourse pressure
(30c) Immature rule system, where the absence of the adult rule leads to errors in productions 
When acquiring causatively alternating verbs children must learn both the semantic representation and the argument structure of each verb to produce grammatical sentences  It has been suggested that children learn this is through the no negative evidence problem; for example a child will learn that the verb ‘throw’ can never be used in a subject position: *”the ball threw”.

In children with specific language impairments 

Children with specific language impairments (SLI) tend to produce less mature responses (i.e., different verb and adjectival) and fewer mature responses (periphrastics and passives) compared to children of the same age comparison (AC). The children with SLI produced slightly fewer overgeneralizations, but in general, did not appear to differ in frequency or type of overgeneralizations when compared to the AC children. In English, children need to be able to organize verbs into three separate syntactic groups in order to properly use causative alternations. These syntactic groups include: 
Fixed intransitives
Fixed transitives
Causatives
While children with SLI can typically use the lexical alternation for causative alternation as well as AC children, they tend to have difficulty using the syntactic cues to deal with verbs with fixed transitivity.

Examples

Indo-European languages

In many Indo-European languages, causative alternation regularly involves the use of a reflexive pronoun, clitic, or affix in the inchoative use of the verb. A reflexive pronoun is a pronoun that is preceded by the noun, adjective, adverb or pronoun to which it refers (its antecedent) within the same clause.

French

French is a Romance language which incorporates the use of a reflexive pronoun with a verb's inchoative form.

Seen in (10) is the causative use of the verb "briser", conjugated in present tense.

Seen in (11) is the anticausative use of the verb.

Note the use of the reflexive pronoun “se” in (11), which is required for the sentence to be grammatically correct in French. When the reflexive pronoun is not present, the sentence is ungrammatical.

Italian

Italian is another Romance language that, like French, incorporates the use of a reflexive pronoun with a verb's inchoative form.

Seen in (12) is the causative use of the verb "chiudere" conjugated in past tense.

Seen in (13) is the anticausative use of the verb.

Note the use of the reflexive pronoun “si” in (13), which behaves in the same manner as the French “se” shown in example (11).

German

It is common for languages to use a reflexive marker to signal the inchoative member of an alternating pair of verbs. Inchoative verbs in German are marked either by the reflexive pronoun “sich”, or not marked at all.

Shown in examples (14) and (15) is a verb that alternates without any use of a reflexive pronoun:

Seen in (14) is the causative use of the verb "zerbrechen", conjugated in past tense.

Seen in (15) is the anticausative use of the verb.

Seen in examples (16) and (17) is an example of a verb that requires a reflexive pronoun to denote the anticausative:

Seen in (16) is the causative use of the verb "öffnen", conjugated in past tense. There is no reflexive pronoun present, it is not needed in the causative use.

This is the causative use of the verb.

Seen in (17) is the anticausative use of the verb.

Note the use of the reflexive pronoun "sich" in (17), which behaves in the same manner as French "se" and Italian "si" seen above in examples (11) and (13).

Asian languages

Japanese
In Japanese, causative alternation is seen in ergative verbs and paired verbs.  Ergative verbs are verbs that can be transitive or intransitive without morphological change, while paired verbs are verbs that require morphological changes in order to be read as transitive or intransitive.

An example of an ergative verb in Japanese is shown below in examples (18) and (19):

Seen in (18) is the causative use of the verb "開く" - "hiraku", conjugated in past tense.

Seen in (19) is the anticausative use of the verb.

Note that in (18) and (19), the form of the verb does not undergo any sort of morphological change, making "開く" an ergative verb.

An example of a paired verb in Japanese is shown below in examples (20) and (21):

In (20), the verb "to drop" takes on the verb form "落とす" - "otosu", conjugated in past tense. The verb "落とす" requires an agent to physically drop an object.

In (21), the verb "to drop" takes on the verb form "落ちる" - "ochiru", conjugated in past tense. The verb "落ちる" is used when there is no agent in the sentence to do the physical dropping of the coin itself.

Chinese
Mandarin Chinese is a language that lacks inflectional morphology that marks tense, case, agreement, or lexical category. The language also does not have derivational morphology to mark the transitivity of verbs. Instead, Mandarin Chinese uses verbal compounding to do causative alternation.

Seen in (22) is the anticausative use of the verb "碎" (suì).

The following examples (23) and (24) show an ungrammatical use of the causative alternative of the verb "碎".

(23) and (24) show that in order for Laozhang to have broken the window, he has to have completed an action in order for it to break. In (23), there is no action that Laozhang performed to cause the window to break, making this sentence ungrammatical. In (24), he hit the window.

Korean

Causative alternation in Korean is difficult to interpret. There have been many attempts to capture the restrictions on Korean causative alternation, but none of them capture the restrictions entirely.

Some verbs in Korean bear similarities to the paired verbs in Japanese. Morphological changes take place in order to show transitivity and intransitivity.

Shown in (25) is the causative use of the verb "열다" - "yeolda", conjugated in past tense.

Shown in (26) is the anticausative use of the verb, conjugated in past tense.

In examples (25) and (26), it is seen that the infinitive (unconjugated) forms of the verb "yeolda" are the same, but causative and anticausative forms take on different conjugated forms in order to show causativity.

Korean also bears similarities to Chinese in its verbal compounding.

Shown in (27) and (28) is an example of a verb that requires compounding in order to be grammatical in the causative use.

Seen in (27) is the anticausative use of the verb "죽다" - "jugda", conjugated in past tense.

Seen in (28) is the causative use of the verb, conjugated in past tense.

Example (28) shows that the verb "jugda" behaves similarly to the verb "sui" in Mandarin Chinese seen in example (24) in that the verb requires some sort of action performed by the agent.

References

Transitivity and valency